Edith Eckbauer (later Edith Baumann; born 27 October 1949) is a German rower who competed for West Germany in the 1976 Summer Olympics.

Eckbauer was born in 1949 in Munich. In 1976 she and her partner Thea Einöder won the bronze medal in the coxless pair event.

References

1949 births
Living people
Olympic rowers of West Germany
Rowers at the 1976 Summer Olympics
Olympic bronze medalists for West Germany
Olympic medalists in rowing
West German female rowers
Medalists at the 1976 Summer Olympics
World Rowing Championships medalists for West Germany
European Rowing Championships medalists